This is a list of Japanese artists. This list is intended to encompass Japanese who are primarily fine artists. For information on those who work primarily in film, television, advertising, manga, anime, video games, or performance arts, please see the relevant respective articles.

Heian and Kamakura periods

Sculptors

Pottery and ceramics

Sumi-e (Ink Painting)

Kanō School

Rimpa School

Tosa School

Kyoto School

Nihonga Painters

Eccentrics and smaller schools

Ukiyo-e painters and printmakers

Modern Artists

See also
List of manga artists
List of Utagawa school members
List of Japanese photographers

References

External links

Artcyclopedia

Artists

Japanese
Japanese